Illange (Lorraine Franconian: Illéng/Illéngen) is a commune in the Moselle department in Grand Est in north-eastern France. It adjoins Thionville.

The Fort d'Illange, a pre-World War I German fortification, is located just to the north of the town, and is operated as an open-air museum.

See also
 Communes of the Moselle department

References

External links
 

Communes of Moselle (department)